Shek Chung Au is a village in the Sha Tau Kok area of North District of Hong Kong.

Administration
Shek Chung Au is a recognised village under the New Territories Small House Policy. It is one of the villages represented within the Sha Tau Kok District Rural Committee. For electoral purposes, Shek Chung Au is part of the Sha Ta constituency, which is currently represented by Ko Wai-kei.

Location
Nearby villages include Wu Shek Kok, located southeast of Shek Chung Au, directly across Sha Tau Kok Road; Shek Kiu Tau in the southwest and Tong To in the northeast.

History
Shek Chung Au was historically an important traffic node, and a military post was located there during several hundred years, until the mid-19th century.

In 1911, the Sha Tau Kok Railway was opened as far as Shek Chung Au. The light railway was then extended to Sha Tau Kok in 1912. Shek Chung Au Station remained as one of the five stations of the line.

On 15 February 2012, areas around Sha Tau Kok (but not the town itself), as well as Mai Po, were taken out of the Frontier Closed Area, opening up 740 hectares (1,800 acres) of land for public access. A checkpoint on the original perimeter, operated by the Police and the Customs and Excise Department at Shek Chung Au, was officially decommissioned on 14 February 2012, and its functions taken over by a new checkpoint outside of Sha Tau Kok.

See also
 Sha Tau Kok Road
 International College Hong Kong
 Starling Inlet

References

External links

 Delineation of area of existing village Shek Chung Au (Sha Tau Kok) for election of resident representative (2019 to 2022)
 Japanese Pillboxes at Shek Chung Au at gwulo.com
 Pictures of the remains of Shek Chung Au Station within Sha Tau Kok Farm
 Antiquities Advisory Board. Historic Building Appraisal. Law Uk, Shek Chung Au Pictures Pictures of Ancillary Block

Villages in North District, Hong Kong
Sha Tau Kok